The Federal government of Mexico (alternately known as the Government of the Republic or  or ) is the national government of the United Mexican States, the central government established by its constitution to share sovereignty over the republic with the governments of the 31 individual Mexican states, and to represent such governments before international bodies such as the United Nations. The Mexican federal government has three branches: executive, legislative, and judicial and functions per the Constitution of the United Mexican States, as enacted in 1917, and as amended.
The executive power is exercised by the executive branch, which is headed by the president and his Cabinet, which, together, are independent of the legislature. Legislative power is vested upon the Congress of the Union, a bicameral legislature comprising the Senate and the Chamber of Deputies. Judicial power is exercised by the judiciary, consisting of the Supreme Court of Justice of the Nation, the Council of the Federal Judiciary, and the collegiate, unitary, and district courts.

Powers of the union
The federal government, known as the Supreme Power of the Federation, is constituted by the Powers of the Union: the legislative, the executive, and the judicial. Mexico City, as the capital of Mexico, seats all the powers of the Union. All branches of government are independent; no two separate branches must be vested upon a single person or institution, and the legislative power must not be vested upon a single individual.

Executive branch 

The President of the United Mexican States is the head of the executive branch of the country. They are also the head of state, the head of government, and the supreme commander of the Armed Forces. The President is elected by direct, popular, and universal suffrage. Once elected, the candidate assumes the position on October 1 of the election year. (Prior to the Electoral Reform of 2014, the office was assumed on December 1 of the election year.) Their position lasts for a period of six years, with no possibility of reelection, not even in the case of having served as interim, provisional or substitute. The office of President of the Republic is only waived for serious cause, which must be qualified by the Congress of the Union. In case of death, dismissal, or resignation, the Secretariat of the Interior immediately and provisionally assumes the position (if the absence is the day of the inauguration, it would be the president of the senate, the provisional president). Later, with the reservations contemplated by the constitution, it is up to Congress to appoint a substitute or interim.

The current Constitution of 1917 provides for said position in its third title third chapter and is addressed by fifteen articles. They specify the obligations, powers requirements, and restrictions to the position; specifications ranging from the command of the armed forces; 
ownership of foreign, economic policies, social development, and public safety; the promulgation and enforcement of laws issued by the legislative branch; 
propose appointments to positions that require of the Senate or the Supreme Court; and various prerogatives granted in other articles of the same magna letter and federal laws.

The President is the head of the Federal Public Administration and is assisted by a cabinet composed of several Secretariats of State, federal agencies, decentralized agencies, and parastatals, which are in charge of various public interest portfolios, in addition to various advisers on call to the
Office of the Presidency. The President is protected by the Presidential General Staff, which is the military technical body that assists the president in obtaining general information, planning the personal activities of the position, performing safety precautions, and participating in the execution of the activities coming for these purposes.

Since the beginning of their term, the official residence of the president Andrés Manuel López Obrador has been the National Palace, a building facing Mexico City Zócalo. The National Palace is also the formal seat of the Executive Power and had been the official seat of power in Mexico since early colonial times until it was moved in 1937 to Los Pinos.

Legislative Branch 

The legislative power is vested upon the Congress of the Union, a bicameral congress comprising the Senate (Spanish: Cámara de Senadores or Senado) and the Chamber of Deputies. The powers of Congress include the right to pass laws, impose taxes, declare war, approve the national budget, approve or reject treaties and conventions made with foreign countries, and ratify diplomatic appointments. The Senate addresses all matters that concern foreign policy, approves international agreements, and confirms presidential appointments.

The Chamber of Deputies is formed by 500 representatives of the nation. All deputies are elected in free universal elections every three years, in parallel voting: 300 deputies are elected in single-seat constituencies by first-past-the-post plurality (called uninominal deputies), and the remaining 200 are elected by the principle of proportional representation (called plurinominal deputies) with closed-party lists for which the country is divided into five constituencies or plurinominal circumscriptions. Deputies cannot be reelected for the next immediate term.

Being a supplementary system (PM) of parallel voting, proportionality is only confined to the plurinominal seats. However, to prevent a party to be overrepresented, several restrictions to the assignation of plurinominal seats are applied:
 A party must obtain at least 2% of votes to be assigned a plurinominal seat;
 A party's percentage of deputies in the Chamber (uninominal and plurinominal together) cannot be more than 8% greater than the percentage of votes the party obtained in the elections;
 No party can have more than 300 seats (uninominal and plurinominal together), even if the party gets more than 52% of the votes.

The Senate consists of 128 representatives of the constituent states of the federation. All senators are elected in free universal elections every six years through a parallel voting system as well: 64 senators are elected by first-past-the-post plurality, two per state and two for Mexico City elected jointly; 32 senators are assigned through the principle of "first minority", that is, they are awarded to the first runner-up party for each constituent state and Mexico City; and 32 are elected by proportional representation with closed-party lists, for which the country forms a single constituency.

Judicial branch 

The judiciary consists of The Supreme Court of Justice, composed of eleven judges or ministers appointed by the President with Congress approval, who interpret laws and judge cases of federal competency. Other institutions of the judiciary are the Electoral Tribunal, collegiate, unitary and district tribunals, and the Council of the Federal Judiciary. The ministers of the Supreme Court will serve for 15 years and cannot be appointed to serve more than once.

State and local powers

The entities of the Mexican Federation are free and sovereigns, autonomous in its internal regime. They have the power to govern themselves according to their own laws; they have their own constitution that doesn't have to contradict the principles of the federal constitution. The powers of its executive and legislative branches they are understood as those that are the rights of the entities; as the ownership of the command of the public force (state police and national guard attached), direction and regulation of their own economic policies, of social development and public safety; as well as the administration of those resources that arise from their local taxes or own income. Griselda Álvarez was the first female governor in Mexico. Álvarez was Governor of the state of Colima from 1979 to 1985.

Internal organization of the states

The states are divided internally into municipalities—or mayors, in the case of Mexico City. Each municipality enjoys autonomy in its capacity 
to choose its own town hall which is responsible, in most cases; to provide all the public services required by its population. To this concept, which would arise from the Mexican Revolution, it is known as free municipality. The town hall is headed by a municipal president elected every three years.

Mexico City (formerly Federal District) 

Mexico City does not belong to any state in particular, but to the federation, being the capital of the country and seat of the powers of the Union. As such, it is constituted as a special jurisdiction, ultimately administered by the Powers of the Union. Nonetheless, since the late 1990s certain autonomy and powers have been gradually devolved. The executive power is vested upon a head of government elected by first-past-the-post plurality. The legislative power is vested upon a unicameral Legislative Assembly. The judicial power is exercised by the Supreme Tribunal of Justice and the Judiciary Council.

Mexico City was divided into delegaciones or boroughs. Though not fully equivalent to a municipality in that they do not have regulatory powers, they have gained limited autonomy in recent years, and the representatives to the head of government are now elected by the citizens as well. In 2016, the name was changed to Mexico City and the 16 delegations were transformed into municipalities, each one with its own mayor.

See also
 State governments of Mexico
 Constitution of Mexico
 Politics of Mexico
 Law of Mexico

References and notes 

 The composition, responsibilities and requirements of the legislative power are outlined in articles 50 to 79 of the Political Constipoo of the United Mexican States Archived November 13, 2006, at the Wayback Machine
 The composition, responsibilities and requirements of the judicial power are outlined in articles 94 to 107of the Political Constitution of the United Mexican States Archived November 13, 2006, at the Wayback Machine
 The form of government of the Mexico City is outlined in the 112th article of the Political Constitution of the United Mexican States Archived 2011-07-22 at the Wayback Machine.

Further reading	
 Merrill, Tim and Ramón Miró. Mexico: a country study (Library of Congress. Federal Research Division, 1996) US government document; not copyright online free

External links 
 Presidency of the United Mexican States
 Congress of the Union
 Supreme Court of Justice of the Nation
 Mexican Council for Economic and Social Development